America's Most Wanted is the fifth studio album American singer-songwriter Calvin Richardson. It was released by Shanachie Records on August 31, 2010. The follow-up to his Bobby Womack tribute album Facts of Life: The Soul of Bobby Womack (2009), it debuted and peaked at number 38 on the US Top R&B/Hip-Hop Albums chart, and earned Richardson another Grammy Award nomination for Best Traditional R&B Vocal Performance at the 53rd Annual Grammy Awards.

Critical reception

AllMusic editor Thom Jurek rated the album three stars out of five. He wrote that "there are some fine tracks here that move beyond Richardson's trademarked, well-traveled Southern soul revivalism. Some of the more urban AC offerings here are oriented for the summer dancefloor season [...] In sum, the pluses on America's Most Wanted outnumber the minuses and Richardson's profile should rise as a result."

Track listing

Notes
  denotes additional producer

Personnel 
Credits adapted from the liner notes of America's Most Wanted.

 Lorien Babajian – package design
 Eric Brice  – producer
 Dave Darlington – mixing engineer
 Randall Grass – executive producer
 Scott Huffman – photography
 Joe Lindsay – producer
 Desmond Lockhart – producer
 Boy Perry – producer
 Calvin Richardson – arranger, producer, vocals
 Kevin Terrell – photography
 Robert Vosgien – mastering engineer

Charts

Release history

References

2010 albums
Calvin Richardson albums
Shanachie Records albums